Pakistan national under-20 football team is the under-20 football (soccer) team of Pakistan. The team participated 2012 AFC U-19 Championship qualification

Coaching staff

Players
 1962 AFC Youth Championship
 1973 AFC Youth Championship
 2000 AFC Youth Championship

U-19 squad
 ''The Players Call-up For 2020 AFC U-19 Championship qualification

Results and fixtures

1991

2019

See also
 Pakistan Football Federation
 Pakistan national football team
 Pakistan national under-23 football team
 Pakistan national under-17 football team

References

External links
 https://int.soccerway.com/teams/pakistan/pakistan-under-19/15721/
 http://www.footballpakistan.com/tag/u19/

Asian national under-20 association football teams
under-20